"If You're Gonna Play in Texas (You Gotta Have a Fiddle in the Band)" is a song written by Murry Kellum and Dan Mitchell, and recorded by American country music band Alabama.  It was released in July 1984 as the B-side of the third single from their Roll On album.  Though "I'm Not That Way Anymore" was released as the A-side, radio programmers preferred the flipside and the song became Alabama's 14th consecutive number-one single on the Billboard Hot Country Singles chart.

During the first weeks the song was on the Billboard chart, "I'm Not That Way Anymore" charted concurrently, being listed as a tag-along B-side.  Since "I'm Not That Way" was intended as the A-side, the song had an accompanying music video which was filmed at Fort Payne High School.

The chorus references "Faded Love" by Texas musician Bob Wills and "Louisiana Man" by Doug Kershaw repeatedly throughout the song.

The song was used as the basis of "If You're Gonna Run in Texas", a radio campaign advertisement produced as part of U.S. Senator Ted Cruz's reelection campaign in 2018.

Critical reception
Kip Kirby, of Billboard magazine reviewed the song favorably, saying that Alabama "obviously enjoys this high-energy instrumental romp through roots."

Single and album edit differences
The single edit was more than a minute shorter than the original album version. Two features were deleted from the single version:

 The opening fanfare, featuring Alabama's vocalists — accompanied by just a piano — singing a few bars of "The Eyes of Texas". This introduction leads into the single's opening, which suddenly picks up the tempo to a quick duple meter.
 A second repeat of the refrain, the first part only accompanied by drums, before the fiddle-led bridge leading to the last part of the song.

The version that appears on the band's Greatest Hits Vol. III album excises the intro but retains the extra refrain.

Charts

Weekly charts

Year-end charts

Certifications

References

Morris, Edward, "Alabama," Contemporary Books Inc., Chicago, 1985
 Roland, Tom, "The Billboard Book of Number One Country Hits" (Billboard Books, Watson-Guptill Publications, New York, 1991)

1984 singles
Alabama (American band) songs
Songs about Texas
Songs about country music
Songs about fiddles
Song recordings produced by Harold Shedd
RCA Records Nashville singles
1984 songs